Cannes XIII are a French Rugby league club based in Cannes, Alpes-Maritimes in the Provence-Alpes-Côte d'Azur region. The club plays in the Provence-Alpes-Côte d'Azur (PACA) League of the French National Division 2. 

In 2011, a French writer reports that there is only a youth section operating in the club.

Club honours
Elite 2
Winners – 1993

Club Details
President:
Address: Cannes Rugby à XIII, 115, avenue Michel Jourdan, La Bocca
Tel: 04 93 47 23 54
Email:

See also

National Division 2

References 

French rugby league teams
Sport in Cannes